ISTC may refer to:

 Illinois Sustainable Technology Center housed at the Prairie Research Institute
 Incunabula Short Title Catalogue
 Independent Sector Treatment Centre, part of the UK National Health Service
 Institute of Scientific and Technical Communicators 
 International Science and Technology Center
 International Space Training Center, the fictional institution behind Mission: Space ride at Epcot
 International Standard Text Code, a numeric code in development by the ISO for textual works
 International Student Travel Confederation
 The former Iron and Steel Trades Confederation trade union, now part of Community (trade union)